Women's suffrage in Venezuela was introduced in 1946. The reform was introduced in 1945 and implemented in 1947 by the government of Rómulo Betancourt.    

The women's movement in Venezuela started late compared to other countries, and did not fully organize until the 1930s. After the death of dictator Juan Vicente Gómez, in 1935, the first women's rights organisation of any note, the Asociacón Cultural Feminina (ACF), was founded and swiftly followed by others. The ACF was a leading organisation in support of women's suffrage. Suffrage was supported by President Rómulo Betancourt, in his effort to appeal to women and minorities.

References 

Venezuela
Feminism and history
Women's rights in Venezuela
Feminism in Venezuela